

Arthropods

New taxa

Conodonts

Dinosaurs 
 Psittacosaurus gastroliths documented.

Newly named dinosaurs 
Data are courtesy of George Olshevky's dinosaur genera list.

Plesiosaurs

New taxa

Synapsids

Non-mammalian

References

 Brown, B. 1941. The last dinosaurs. – Natural History 48: 290–295.
 Sanders F, Manley K, Carpenter K. Gastroliths from the Lower Cretaceous sauropod Cedarosaurus weiskopfae. In: Tanke D.H, Carpenter K, editors. Mesozoic vertebrate life: new research inspired by the paleontology of Philip J. Currie. Indiana University Press; Bloomington, IN: 2001. pp. 166–180.

1940s in paleontology
Paleontology
Paleontology 1